Goodenia brachypoda is a species of flowering plant in the family Goodeniaceae and is endemic to northern Australia. It is a low-lying to upright herb with narrow elliptic to oblong leaves, racemes of yellow flowers with leaf-like bracts at the base, and more or less spherical fruit.

Description

Taxonomy and naming
This goodenia was first formally described in 1868 by George Bentham and given the name Goodenia sepalosa var. brachypoda in Flora Australiensis from an unpublished description by Ferdinand von Mueller. In 1990, Carolin raised the variety to species status as G. brachypoda. The specific epithet (brachypoda) means "short-footed", referring to the short peduncles.

Distribution
This goodenia grows in the Northern Kimberley, Victoria Bonaparte and Ord Victoria Plain biogeographic regions of northern Western Australia and the north-west of the Northern Territory.

Conservation status
Goodenia brachypoda is classified as "Priority One" by the Government of Western Australia Department of Parks and Wildlife, meaning that it is known from only one or a few locations which are potentially at risk, but as of "least concern" under the Northern Territory Government Territory Parks and Wildlife Conservation Act 1976.

References

brachypoda
Eudicots of Western Australia
Flora of the Northern Territory
Plants described in 1868
Taxa named by Ferdinand von Mueller
Taxa named by George Bentham